Franciszek Dobrowolski (1830-1896) was a Polish theatre director, editor of Dziennik Poznański (Poznań Daily).

References

 Witold Jakóbczyk, Przetrwać na Wartą 1815-1914, Dzieje narodu i państwa polskiego, vol. III-55, Krajowa Agencja Wydawnicza, Warszawa 1989.

1830 births
1896 deaths
Polish theatre directors
People from the Grand Duchy of Posen